Pavel Beneš (14 June 1894 in Prague - 31 May 1956 in Prague) was a chief designer at ČKD-Praga, one of the largest engineering companies in the former Czechoslovakia and today's Czech Republic.

Beneš was first a founder and chief designer at Avia, along with Miroslav Hajn, in 1919.  The two began repairing planes in a workshop within the complex of an old sugar factory in Prague.  One year later, they designed their first two-seater plane, the Avia BH-1.  From 1923 to 1925, the two developed the BH-7, BH-9, and BH-11 monoplanes, launching the era of biplane fighters.  The BH-11 won the Coppa d' Italia prize.  Three years later, their BH-21 fighter was considered one of the world's best planes.

In 1930, Beneš and Hajn came to ČKD-Praga. The first aircraft they designed was the Praga E-39 in 1931.

In April 1935, he joined Jaroslav Mráz to form the Beneš-Mráz aircraft factory in Choceň.

References

Czech aerospace engineers
Aviation inventors
Aerodynamicists
Czechoslovak inventors
1894 births
1956 deaths
Engineers from Prague
Aircraft designers